Swimming in Yugoslavia (SFRJ)

Olympics 

Yugoslavian swimmers at Olympics

World Championships 

Yugoslavian swimmers at FINA World Championships

European Championships 

Yugoslavian swimmers at European Championships

Mediterranean Games 

1979, Split, Croatia, Yugoslavia

Balkan Aquatic Games

National Championships

Youth Seniors

Youth Juniors U16: 16 Years of Age and Younger

Youth U14: Children 14 Years of Age and Younger

Youth U12: Children 12 Years of Age and Younger

Youth U10: Children 10 Years of Age and Younger

References